County Line is the fourth studio album by Canadian country music group High Valley. It was released on October 14, 2014 by Open Road Recordings. The record is their first to be released as a duo, following the departure of Bryan Rempel. It includes the top-10 country radio singles "Rescue You", "County Line", "Make You Mine", "She's with Me", "Come on Down" and "Be You".

Critical reception
Markos Papadatos of Digital Journal gave the album four and a half stars out of five, writing that "Brothers Brad and Curtis Rempel are exceptional on this new album. They soar on harmonies where the listener can recall Rascal Flatts and Diamond Rio." Shenieka Russell-Metcalf of Top Country wrote that "Brad and Curtis didn't miss a beat with this 10 track album. They have a great mix of content, great harmonies and strong lyrical content."

Track listing

Chart performance

Singles

References

External links
 County Line at AllMusic

2014 albums
High Valley albums
Open Road Recordings albums